Der Bockerer is a 1981 Austrian drama film directed by Franz Antel. It was entered into the 12th Moscow International Film Festival where Karl Merkatz won the award for Best Actor. The film was also selected as the Austrian entry for the Best Foreign Language Film at the 54th Academy Awards, but was not accepted as a nominee.

Cast
 Karl Merkatz as Karl Bockerer
 Alfred Böhm as Hatzinger
 Hans Holt as Herr Hofrat
 Marte Harell
 Ida Krottendorf as Sabine (Binerl) Bockerer
 Rolf Kutschera
 Erni Mangold as Besitzerin des Café Tosca
 Heinz Marecek as Dr. Rosenblatt
 Marianne Nentwich as Anna Hermann
 Thaddäus Podgorski as Pfalzner (as Teddy Podgorsky)
 Sieghardt Rupp as Herr Hermann
 Regina Sattler as Elisabeth (as Regine Sattler)
 Franz Stoss as Herr General (as Franz Stoß)
 Klausjürgen Wussow as Dr. Lamm

See also
 List of submissions to the 54th Academy Awards for Best Foreign Language Film
 List of Austrian submissions for the Academy Award for Best Foreign Language Film

References

External links
 

1981 films
1981 drama films
Austrian drama films
1980s German-language films
Films directed by Franz Antel
Austrian films based on plays